Nomads is a 2010 drama film directed and written by Ricardo Benet, the film is starring Lucy Liu. The film was filmed and premiered in Mexico and New York City and its release is scheduled for January 22, 2011.

Premise 
The story centers on a documentary filmmaker (Lucy Liu) who is making a picture about subway suicides.

Cast 
 Lucy Liu as Susan
 Tamlyn Tomita
 Agim Kaba
 John Cothran, Jr. as Phil
 Tenoch Huerta
 Dagoberto Gama
 Michael Den Dekker as Man in Wheelchair
 Rebekah Neumann as Sam

Production 
The filming locations and scenes were made in New York City, United States and Mexico, during October, 2009.

References

External links 
 
 

2010 films
2010 drama films
American drama films
2010s English-language films
2010s American films